Revenge of the Black Best Friend is a Canadian comedy web series, which premiered in 2022 on CBC Gem. Created by Amanda Parris, the series stars Oluniké Adeliyi as Dr. Toni Shakur, a self-help guru who specializes in helping Black actors who long for more than just the stereotypical supporting roles.

The cast also includes Ashton James, Andrea Lewis, Cara Ricketts, Dwain Murphy, Izad Etemadi, Jameson Kraemer, Julian De Zotti, Dan Duran, Natasha Mumba, Samantha Brown, Rachael Crawford, Khadijah Roberts-Abdullah, Araya Mengesha, Krista Morin, Kit Weyman and Perrie Voss.

Awards

References

External links

2022 web series debuts
2022 Canadian television series debuts
2020s Black Canadian television series
Canadian comedy web series
CBC Gem original programming